Réquista (primarily Ric Estar) is a commune in the Aveyron department in southern France.

Geography

Location

Climate

History

Toponymy
In Occitan, the commune is called Requistar. The name comes from the term ric estar which means "rich place".

Coat of arms

Politics and administration

List of mayors

Population and society

Demography

Cultural events and festivities
Since Réquista is the first sheep canton in Europe, a sheep festival is organized every year on the first Sunday of June. A statue of a sheep and its lamb is also erected in front of the town hall. Every Monday morning (or Tuesday morning if Monday happens to be a holiday), the sheep market attracts breeders from the region as well as many buyers from neighboring departments. It begins at 9:00am with gray lambs, continues with lamb exports at 9:30am, cull ewes at 10:00am and lambs at 10:30am. The introduction of this market in 1992 necessitated the construction of a area big enough to fit an annual volume of 120,000 people (4,400m²). Quotations are recorded weekly and serve as reference to the national plan.

Festivities
 Ovine market every Monday (Tuesday if Monday is a holiday)
 Weekly market in the covered hall from 7:30am to 12:30pm every Saturday
 Monthly fair the second Thursday of the month from 8:30am to 12:00pm
 Estofinado at the end of March
 Feast of the sheep every year on the first Sunday of June
 Bellegarde Hospital Festival the penultimate weekend of June
 Flea market garage sale gourmet market during Lincou weekend after July 14
 Lincou Festival the first weekend of August
 Large flea market in Réquista the 3rd weekend of September
 Christmas market on the last Sunday of November
 Medieval day at the college Céléstin Sourrèzes organized by 5th year students
 Feast of Saint-Julien (municipality of Réquista) with a lottery (Friday), meal and prom musette (Saturday) and bodega (Sunday) penultimate weekend of August
 Fair at the flea market and exhibition of vintage cars the 3rd weekend of September
 Fireworks at Lincou and votive festival the first weekend of August
 Lottery numbers in Réquista and around
 Wine tasting at the company of chiais
 Festival of trout August 15 organized by Lévezou Ségala Aveyron XV
 Votive festival in Lebous the 2nd weekend in September

Local associations
 The motorcycle club Réquista has a cross field.
 National petanque.
 Dance Gala with students Josiane Nespoulous.
 Commercial Fortnight (last week of July and first of August) organized by the Union of Traders and Craftsmen of Réquista

Nadalet de Réquista
Nadalet de Réquista is a song in Occitan written by Paul Bonnefous in 1864. It is sung every year at the Mass on December 24 by the choir of the church of Réquista.

Places and monuments
 Church of Réquista
 Museum art gallery of the Lincou manor

In other languages 
The name of the region/commune of Réquista is pronounced Request in English, which is also an acceptable and well recognized name of the region/commune.

Communes of the Aveyron department

References

Communes of Aveyron
Aveyron communes articles needing translation from French Wikipedia